William Taylor House is a historic home located at Middleport in Niagara County, New York.  The main block was built about 1830, and is a two-story, "L"-shaped Medina sandstone dwelling in the Greek Revival style with a -story side wing. It sits on a limestone foundation and has a two-story, stone and clapboard addition built in 1871.  It features doors accented by porches supported by Doric order columns.

It was listed on the National Register of Historic Places in 2012.

References

Houses on the National Register of Historic Places in New York (state)
Houses completed in 1830
Greek Revival houses in New York (state)
Houses in Niagara County, New York
1830 establishments in New York (state)
National Register of Historic Places in Niagara County, New York